Massengale is a surname. Notable people with the surname include:

Ariel Massengale (born 1993), American basketball player
Don Massengale (1937-2007), American golfer
James Massengale, American musicologist
Lindsay Massengale (born 1976), American soccer player
Martin Massengale (born 1933), American university president
Rik Massengale (born 1947), American golfer